Yamikani Janet Banda; known professionally as Lady Zamar, is a South African singer and songwriter. She was born on 19 June 1995  in Tembisa, South Africa and was raised in Thembisa. She mainly incorporates elements of house music in her songs and primarily sings in English which appeals to a wide audience. In 2019 she was a guest judge on the Idols South Africa television show.

Career

2014-2016: Lady Zamar & Junior Taurus, Cotton Candy 
Lady Zamar and Junior Taurus met in 2011 and initially formed a duo. On October 14, 2015, their debut album Cotton Candy was released. The album  produced  three singles  includes; "Mamelodi", "Run Away" and "Pitori".

At the 22nd ceremony of South African Music Awards,  Cotton Candy was nominated for Duo/Group of the Year and Best Dance Album. Soon after its release she announced that she was pursuing a solo career.

2017-present: Solo projects, King Zamar, Monarch 
Her first solo album, King Zamar, was released in March 2017. In February 2018 the album was certified gold, in June 2019 it was certified double platinum.

In 2017, Lady Zamar won the Song of the Year Award at the DStv Mzansi Viewers Choice Awards for her song "Charlotte", produced by Prince Kaybee.
At  the 24th South African Music Awards she won the award for Best Dance Album. On 11 March 2018, she headlined to Vivo Nation  Festival.

On  9 August 2018, National woman's day, she performed at a concert dedicated to women alongside fellow artists Mafikizolo and Sho Madjozi.

Her second solo album Monarch was released on 21 June 2019.

At the 2019  4th ceremony of Mzansi Kwaito and House Music Awards her single "This is Love" won Best house single.

Discography

Studio albums

Awards and nominations
Throughout her career as a solo artist, she has received several awards, including 3 SAMA awards, 1 Independent Music Award.

References

21st-century South African women singers
Living people
People from Gauteng
1987 births